Wing and a Prayer is a BAFTA-nominated British television legal drama series, written and created by Matthew Hall, first broadcast on Channel 5 on 22 September 1997. The series, produced by Thames Television, was described as "an inside, behind-the-scenes look at the practice of law, and the lawyers whose lives are caught up in their work with each other". Sean Arnold starred as primary character Stephen Arlington, while Rita Wolf, David Bark-Jones, Philip Martin Brown and George Irving are also credited amongst the principal cast members.

A review of the series on AllMovie stated; "in the fine tradition of such American weeklies as L.A. Law and The Practice, the attorneys herein played as hard as they worked, with sexual intrigues and one-upsmanship abounding." The first series was released on DVD in Australia on 5 June 2013.

Cast
 Sean Arnold as Stephen Arlington
 Rita Wolf as Jasmin Jamal 
 David Bark-Jones as Simon Hudson
 Philip Martin Brown as John Daley 
 George Irving as Judge Michael Freeman 
 Connie Hyde as Catherine Heywood
 Kate Buffery as Amanda Dankwith 
 Mark Womack as Chris Merchant 
 William Ilkley as Kevin Granger 
 Dominic Mafham as Carl Hallam
 Maureen Beattie as Anna Crozier
 Geoffrey McGivern as Don Gittings

Episodes

Series 1 (1997)

Series 2 (1999)
 Broadcast of Series 2 was switched from 8pm on Wednesdays to Sundays mid-way through the series.

References

External links

1997 British television series debuts
1999 British television series endings
1990s British drama television series
1990s British crime television series
1990s British legal television series
English-language television shows
Channel 5 (British TV channel) original programming
Television series by Fremantle (company)
Television shows produced by Thames Television
Television shows set in London